Kenneth Lerner (born May 27, 1948) is an American television, stage and film actor. He is known for playing Principal Flutie in the first episodes of the television series Buffy the Vampire Slayer, and earlier roles on Happy Days, along with numerous film and television guest-starring roles.

Personal life
Lerner was born in Brooklyn, New York, of Romanian-Jewish descent. His parents are Blanche and George Lerner, who was a fisherman and antiques dealer.

Career

Lerner is typically typecast as whiny or unlucky characters, including an agent who is stabbed in the back with a pen by Arnold Schwarzenegger's character Ben Richards in The Running Man. One of his first roles was as one of the Malachi Brothers in the television series Happy Days in 1975–76.

In 2011, Lerner was seen in an American nationally televised commercial for Wells Fargo Bank. In late 2013, Lerner starred in a commercial for T-Mobile USA. In 2016, Lerner played a small role as a corrupt business manager named Arthur in the HBO television series Silicon Valley.

Selected filmography 

1975-1983 Happy Days as Frankie / Rocco Malachi / Rocco Baruffi (10 episodes)
 1977 Hot Tomorrows as Michael
 1977 Grand Theft Auto as Eagle I
 1979 Gas Pump Girls as 'Peewee', Member of The Vultures Motorcycle Gang
 1980 Any Which Way You Can as Tony Paoli Jr.
 1984 Irreconcilable Differences as Doctor 
 1985 Secret Admirer as Waiter
 1985 Love on the Run as Aaron
 1985 The A-Team (TV Series) as Steward
 1986 Miracles as Stuart
 1986 Jake Speed as Ken
 1987 Project X as Finley
 1987 The Running Man as Agent
 1988 Maniac Cop as Mayor Killium (uncredited) (Scenes not present in USA release, added in Japanese version as a subplot)
 1989 Hit List as Gravenstein
 1989 Relentless as Arthur
 1989 The Fabulous Baker Boys as Ray
 1989 Immediate Family as Josh
 1990 The Golden Girls as Doctor (Season 6, Episode 1: "Blanche Delivers")
 1990 RoboCop 2 as Tom Delaney
 1990 The Exorcist III as Dr. Freedman
 1991 Fast Getaway as Tony Bush
 1991 The Doctor as Pete
 1991 Diary of a Hitman as Optometrist
 1991 And You Thought Your Parents Were Weird as Matthew Carson, Home Movies
 1992 Unlawful Entry as Roger Graham
 1993 Mother's Boys as Jude's Analyst
 1994 Rave Review as Saul Slobin
 1994 Fast Getaway II as Tony Bush
 1994 Relentless IV: Ashes to Ashes as Al Rosenberg
 1995 For Better or Worse as Sergeant Moss
 1995 Bodily Harm as Alex Shaw
 1996 Dead Girl as Producer
 1997 Buffy the Vampire Slayer (TV Series) as Principal Bob Flutie
 1997 High Voltage as Justice of The Peace (uncredited)
 1998 Senseless as Dean Barlow
 1998 Godzilla as Teacher (uncredited)
 1999 The Story of Us as Dr. Rifkin
 2000 Boys Life 3 as Judge Levin (segment "Inside Out")
 2001 The Woman Every Man Wants as Rosen
 2001 They Crawl as Glen, The Coroner
 2001 Mafioso: The Father, the Son as Sid Freeman
 2003 National Security as Hank's Lawyer
 2003 Friends as Professor Spafford (Season 9, Episode 20: "The One with the Soap Opera Party")
 2003 Frankie and Johnny Are Married as Rob, Production Manager
 2004 True Vinyl as Hotel Clerk
 2005 Scrubs (TV Series) as Charles James 
 2005 Jesus, Mary and Joey as Saulley
 2006 All In as Rosenbloom
 2006 NCIS (TV Series, in Bloodbath) as Albert Hencheck (uncredited) 
 2006 Undisputed II: Last Man Standing as Phil Gold
 2009 Desperate Housewives (TV Series) as Dr. Bernstein 
 2009 Two and a Half Men (TV Series) as Dr. Levine
 2011 L.A. Noire (Video Game) as Walter Mensch (voice)
 2011 The Mentalist (TV Series) as Judge Markland
 2012 The Big Bang Theory (TV Series) as Dr. Schneider
 2013 Anger Management (TV Series) as Judge
 2016 Silicon Valley (TV Series) as Arthur
 2017-2023 The Goldbergs (TV Series) as Lou Schwartz
 2018 Bayou Caviar as Shlomo
 2022 Dahmer – Monster: The Jeffrey Dahmer Story as Joe Zilber

References

External links 
Golden Girls 1990 doctor Interview at Watcher's Web

http://www.kenlerner.com/

1948 births
American male film actors
American male television actors
American people of Romanian-Jewish descent
Brooklyn College alumni
Jewish American male actors
Living people
Male actors from New York City
People from Brooklyn
21st-century American Jews